Tasque is a commune in the Gers department of southwestern France. It contains a stone Catholic church.

Geography

Population

See also
Communes of the Gers department

References

Communes of Gers